Hrádek is a municipality and village in Hradec Králové District in the Hradec Králové Region of the Czech Republic. It has about 200 inhabitants.

History

The first written mention of Hrádek is from 1377. A fortress stood here until 1528.

Sights
The landmark of Hrádek is the Church of Saint George. It was built in 1692, after the old wooden church from the first half of the 14th century was destroyed during the Thirty Years' War.

Despite its name, the neo-Gothic Hrádek u Nechanic Castle from 1839–1857 in the vicinity of the village is located outside the municipal territory.

References

External links

Villages in Hradec Králové District